Abaeté Linhas Aéreas S/A was a domestic airline based in Lauro de Freitas, near Salvador da Bahia, Brazil founded in 1994. It ceased operations in 2012 and in 2018 had its license revoked. In 2019, it returned their operations, now using the name of Abaeté Aviação.

History
Abaeté Linhas Aéreas can trace its origins to Aerotáxi Abaeté, an air taxi airline established in 1979. In 1994, Aerotaxi Abaeté received authorization to establish a sister company called Abaeté Linhas Aéreas, dedicated to the operation of scheduled services. Both companies continue to offer services as charter and scheduled airlines and sometimes interchange aircraft.

Destinations
In August 2011, Abaeté Linhas Aéreas operated scheduled services to the following destinations:

Bom Jesus da Lapa – Bom Jesus da Lapa Airport
Guanambi – Guanambi Airport
Salvador da Bahia – Deputado Luís Eduardo Magalhães International Airport
São Luís – Marechal Cunha Machado International Airport

Fleet
As of December 2011, the fleet of Abaeté Linhas Aéreas includes the following aircraft:

Airline affinity program
Abaeté Linhas Aéreas had no Frequent Flyer Program.

See also
Abaeté Aviação
List of defunct airlines of Brazil

References

External links

Defunct airlines of Brazil
Airlines established in 1994
Airlines disestablished in 2012
1994 establishments in Brazil
Companies based in Bahia